Alex Robert Munson (born September 25, 1941) is an inactive American jurist. He was sworn in as chief judge of the District Court for the Northern Mariana Islands on November 18, 1988, and he took senior status effective February 28, 2010. Prior to assuming his position on the District Court for the Northern Mariana Islands, in 1981 he was appointed the Chief Justice of the High Court of the Trust Territory of the Pacific Islands, and in 1989 became a designated judge for the District Court of Guam.

References

1941 births
Living people
20th-century American judges
21st-century American judges
Guamanian judges
Northern Mariana Islands judges
People from South Gate, California
United States district court judges appointed by Ronald Reagan
United States district court judges appointed by Bill Clinton